was a Japanese football player.

Playing career
Sekimoto was born in Osaka Prefecture on May 23, 1978. After graduating from high school, he joined Japan Football League club Sagan Tosu in 1997. He played many matches from the first season and the club was promoted to the J2 League in 1999. He retired at the end of the 2002 season. In 2013, he returned to play for Prefectural Leagues club FC Ise-Shima. However, he was diagnosed with osteosarcoma in August 2014. On January 23, 2016, he died of leiomyosarcoma, a type of cancer in Osaka Prefecture at the age of 37.

Club statistics

References

External links

1978 births
2016 deaths
Association football people from Osaka Prefecture
Japanese footballers
J2 League players
Japan Football League (1992–1998) players
Sagan Tosu players
Association football defenders
Deaths from leiomyosarcoma
Deaths from cancer in Japan